Kasiano "Kas" Lealamanua (born 15 December 1976) is a Samoan rugby union player. Lealamanua plays Prop for Saracens in the Guinness Premiership. Having previously played for Biarritz and US Dax for a number of seasons in the Top 14.
Lealamanua has represented Samoa a number of times, at both the 2003 and 2007 world cups. Lealamanua has also represented the Pacific Islanders 2008.

Notes

Samoan rugby union players
Living people
1976 births
Biarritz Olympique players
Samoa international rugby union players
Pacific Islanders rugby union players
Samoan expatriate rugby union players
Expatriate rugby union players in England
Expatriate rugby union players in France
Samoan expatriate sportspeople in England
Samoan expatriate sportspeople in France
Rugby union players from Wellington City
Rugby union props